Callistosporium elegans is a species of fungus known from São Tomé and Príncipe.

References 

 Callistosporium elegans at mycobank

Agaricales
Fungi described in 2017
Biota of São Tomé and Príncipe